The 1992 UCI Road World Championships took place in Benidorm, Spain. Because this was an Olympic year, all the Olympic events served as World Championships, which left just the Professional road race and the Women's Team Time Trial to be contested.

Events summary

References

 
UCI Road World Championships by year
World Championships
World Championships, 1992
UCI Road World Championships
Cycling competitions in Spain